Mark Geoffrey Lane (born 26 January 1968) is a retired English cricketer, who was the head coach of the England women's cricket team between 2008 and 2013.

Lane made six appearances in List A cricket for Berkshire County Cricket Club between 1996 and 2001, scoring 74 runs and claiming 13 dismissals as wicket-keeper. He also played for Hampshire and Surrey's second elevens, before becoming a coach with Surrey.

He became coach of the England women's team on 16 April 2008, following the sudden resignation of Mark Dobson midway through a tour of Australia and New Zealand. He coached England to victories in both the 2009 World Cup and Twenty/20 Championship.

References

External links

1968 births
Living people
Berkshire cricketers
Cricketers from Aldershot
English cricket coaches
English cricketers
Wicket-keepers